Efkan Bekiroğlu (born 14 September 1995) is a German footballer who plays as a midfielder for Alanyaspor.

Career
Bekiroğlu began his footballing career with the semi-pro sides FC Phönix München and FC Unterföhring in his native Germany. From there, he moved to the reserve side FC Augsburg II in the Regionalliga, and earned a move to 1860 Munich in 2018 in the 3. Liga. In the summer of 2020, he transferred to Alanyaspor in the Turkish Süper Lig.

Personal life
Born in Germany, is of Turkish descent.

References

External links
 Profile at DFB.de
 Profile at kicker.de
 TFF Profile

1995 births
Living people
People from Dachau
Sportspeople from Upper Bavaria
German footballers
German people of Turkish descent
Association football midfielders
FC Augsburg II players
TSV 1860 Munich players
Alanyaspor footballers
3. Liga players
Süper Lig players
Regionalliga players
FC Unterföhring players
Footballers from Bavaria